Lou Wen-ngau (born 1919, died in the 1960s) was a Chinese long-distance runner who was deaf and mute. He competed in the marathon at the 1948 Summer Olympics.

References

1919 births
1960s deaths
Year of death missing
Athletes (track and field) at the 1948 Summer Olympics
Chinese male long-distance runners
Chinese male marathon runners
Olympic athletes of China
Runners from Shanghai
Chinese deaf people
Deaf competitors in athletics